The 2016 Asian Cycling Championships took place at Izu Ōshima and at the Izu Velodrome in Izu, Japan from 19 to 30 January 2016.

Medal summary

Road

Men

Women

Track

Men

Women

Medal table

References
Track results
Road results

External links
Official website
Asian Cycling Federation

Asia
Asia
Asian Cycling Championships
Asian Cycling Championships
International cycle races hosted by Japan
Cycling Championships